Murder at Glen Athol is a 1936 American film directed by Frank R. Strayer.

Plot summary
A famous detective is invited to a swanky party at an elegant mansion. Before the night is over, he finds himself involved with gangsters, blackmail and murder.

Cast
John Miljan as Bill Holt, the detective
Irene Ware as Jane Maxwell
Iris Adrian as Muriel Randel
Noel Madison as Gus Colleti
Oscar Apfel as Reuben Marshall
Barry Norton as Tom Randel
Harry Holman as Campbell Snowden
Betty Blythe as Ann Randel
Lew Kelly as Police Sgt. Olsen
Wilson Benge as Simpson, the Randel Butler
E.H. Calvert as Dist. Atty. McDougal

External links

1936 films
American mystery films
American black-and-white films
Films based on American novels
Films based on mystery novels
Films directed by Frank R. Strayer
Chesterfield Pictures films
1936 mystery films
1930s English-language films
1930s American films